Anderegg is a surname. Notable people with the surname include: 

Bob Anderegg (born 1937), American basketball player
Jake Anderegg, American politician
Jakob Anderegg (1829–1878), Swiss mountain guide
Melchior Anderegg (1828–1914), Swiss mountain guide